Conilithes brockenensis is an extinct species of sea snail, a marine gastropod mollusk, in the family Conidae, the cone snails and their allies.

Distribution
This species occurs in New Zealand.

References

Conidae